Courteenhall House, Courteenhall, Northamptonshire, England is an 18th-century country house built for Sir William Wake, 9th Baronet. Wake's architect was Samuel Saxon. The architectural style of the house is Neoclassical, and it is described by Pevsner as having been built with "great restraint but great sensitivity". Construction took place between 1791 and 1793. The grounds were laid out by Humphry Repton. The house remains the private home of the Wake family. Courteenhall House is a Grade II* listed building. The surrounding gardens and parkland are listed Grade II.

History
The original estate at Courteenhall was a possession of St James's Abbey at Northampton. At the Dissolution of the monasteries it was bought by the Ouseleys. The estate came into the possession of the Wake baronets in the 18th century. The Wakes had farmed in Northamptonshire since the mid-13th century. On the advice of Humphry Repton, Sir William Wake (1768–1846) built a new house, on higher ground to the north west of the Ouseley's house. His architect, also a recommendation of Repton, was Samuel Saxon, who had trained in the office of Sir William Chambers. The house was built between 1791 and 1793. Courteenhall remains the private home of the Wake family but is occasionally open for events, or for private hire.

Architecture and description
The house is of three storeys and seven bays, with a hipped roof. It is built of local limestone ashlar. The architectural style is neoclassical and Pevsner repeatedly references the sophisticated and refined style of the design. The interior follows a typical 18th century pattern, with entrance hall, drawing room, dining room and library.

The house is a Grade I listed building. The stable block, with attached coach houses, stables and a barn, is also listed Grade II*. The stables have been attributed to John Carr. The surrounding garden and parkland, notable for its trees, is designated Grade II on the Register of Historic Parks and Gardens of Special Historic Interest in England. The park was laid out by Repton.

Footnotes

References

Sources
 
 

Houses completed in the 18th century
Grade II* listed houses
Grade II* listed buildings in Northamptonshire
Gardens by Humphry Repton